Parliamentary elections were held in Greece on 29 October 1961 to elect members of the Hellenic Parliament. The result was a third consecutive victory for Konstantinos Karamanlis and his National Radical Union (ERE), which won 176 of the 300 seats.

Results

Aftermath 
The elections were quickly denounced by both main opposition parties, the leftist United Democratic Left (campaigning as part of the All-Democratic Agricultural Front) and the Centre Union. They refused to recognise the result because of the numerous cases of voter intimidation and irregularities, such as sudden massive increases in support for ERE against historical patterns and the voting by deceased persons. The Centre Union alleged that the election result had been staged by the agents of the shadowy "para-state" (παρακράτος), including the army leadership, the Greek Central Intelligence Service and the notoriously right-wing National Guard Defence Battalions, according to a prepared emergency plan codenamed Pericles (Σχέδιο «Περικλής»). Although irregularities certainly occurred, the existence of Pericles was never proven, and it is uncertain that the interference in the elections had radically influenced the outcome. Nevertheless, Centre Union leader George Papandreou initiated an "unrelenting struggle" ("ανένδοτος αγών") until new and fair elections were held. Thus, the 1961 elections became known in the Greek political history as the "elections of violence and fraud" (εκλογές της βίας και νοθείας).

References

Sources 

Parliamentary elections in Greece
Greece
Legislative election
1960s in Greek politics
Greece
Legislative
Konstantinos Karamanlis